Busteed is a surname. Notable people with the name include:
Kimberley Busteed (born 1986), Australian beauty pageant winner
Richard Busteed (1822–98), Irish-born American civil war general and attorney
William Busteed (1848–unknown), American gambler and underworld figure in New York City